Lampe is an unincorporated community in southern Stone County, Missouri, United States. It is located on Route 13, south of Table Rock Lake.

The community is part of the Branson, Missouri Micropolitan Statistical Area.  The ZIP Code for Lampe is 65681.

References

Unincorporated communities in Stone County, Missouri
Branson, Missouri micropolitan area
Unincorporated communities in Missouri